"Our Selena is Dying" is the forty-third episode and the eighth episode of the third season (1988–89) of the television series The Twilight Zone. The story, which was written from a previously unproduced outline by The Twilight Zones long deceased creator Rod Serling, deals with a wealthy family whose members have preserved their lives by exchanging their old age for the youth of others.

Plot
Doctor Burrell, physician for the wealthy Brockman clan, confirms the family matriarch, Selena, is dying. Burrell despises the Brockmans, particularly Selena's malicious niece Diane, but feels obligated to work for them as his family has for generations.

Selena sends for her niece Debra, whom she has never met. Intrigued, Debra takes the invitation. At the mansion she meets Diane's mother Martha, who is nearly catatonic, and Selena, who grabs Debra's hand.

The next day, Debra has a liver spot and Selena is up and fully recovered. Dr. Burrell is surprised and incredulous. Late that evening, Debra calls Burrell. He comes over and, finding she has the appearance of premature aging, sends her to the hospital. Fearing the unknown malady may be contagious, Dr. Burrell examines the other residents of the Brockman mansion and discovers a scar on Diane's arm. When he mentions his concern for Debra, Selena and Diane immediately dismiss him. Outside, the Brockmans' deaf handyman, Orville, shows him a diary with a photograph from 1940 of a girl who looks like Diane, with a scar in the same place as Diane's. The diary recounts how Martha burned her arm in a fire.

Burrell slips back into the house and examines Martha, confirming by the absence of a scar that "Martha" is really Diane, and Martha switched ages with her. Realizing Selena did the same thing to Debra, he confronts Selena and demands she return Debra's years to her. She refuses, and Martha attacks Burrell. A disoriented Diane enters with a gas lantern crying for her mother. Martha shoves her away, knocking the lantern from her hands. The house is engulfed in flames. Dr. Burrell tries to help them but barely escapes with his own life. A neighbor sees a woman on fire break through a window and leave. The next morning Burrell identifies the corpses of Selena, Martha, and Orville. Debra's youth is restored and Dr. Burrell tells her the whole story.

At the hospital, Diane is taken in with burns all over her body and labeled Jane Doe. The doctor concludes all they can do is make her comfortable as she dies. However, her left arm is healing quickly and a nurse complains of a burn she does not recall receiving.

See also
Queen of the Nile, an episode from the original series which also centers on longevity sustained through victimization

External links
 

1988 American television episodes
The Twilight Zone (1985 TV series season 3) episodes
Television episodes written by Rod Serling

fr:Tante Selena est mourante